Krasnokholmsky is a rural locality (a selo) and the administrative centre of Krasnokholmsky Selsoviet, Kaltasinsky District, Bashkortostan, Russia. The population was 8,021 as of 2010. There are 54 streets.

Geography 
Krasnokholmsky is located 17 km west of Kaltasy (the district's administrative centre) by road. Kiyebak is the nearest rural locality.

References 

Rural localities in Kaltasinsky District